1214 km is a rural locality (a village) in Voyegurtskoye Rural Settlement of Balezinsky District, Russia. The population was 10 as of 2008.

Geography 
The village is located on the left tributary of the Cheptsa River.

Streets 
There is no streets with titles.

References 

Rural localities in Udmurtia